Phyllurus kabikabi, also known as the Oakview leaf-tailed gecko is a gecko found in Australia. It is endemic to Oakview National Park in Queensland.

References

Phyllurus
Geckos of Australia
Endemic fauna of Australia
Reptiles described in 2008
Taxa named by Patrick J. Couper
Taxa named by Ben Hamley
Taxa named by Conrad J. Hoskin